Farhadi is an Iranian surname. Notable people with this surname include:

 Adib Farhadi (born 1972), Afghan-American academician
 Asghar Farhadi (born 1972), Iranian film director and screenwriter
 Esmaeil Farhadi (born 1982), Iranian football player 
 Mohammad Farhadi (born 1949), Iranian physician, politician and government minister
 Ravan A. G. Farhâdi (born 1929), Afghani diplomat who was Afghanistan's Ambassador to the United Nations from 1993 to 2006. Also a linguist, researcher and translator
 Sarina Farhadi (born 1998), Iranian actress